Paula Davis, (born November 25, 1973) is a Republican member of the Louisiana House of Representatives.

Work in House

For the 2020-2024 legislative term, Davis has been appointed by the Speaker of the House as Chair of the House Commerce Committee. She is also a member of the House Executive Committee, House Select Leadership Committee, Joint Select Committee on Louisiana Economic Recovery, Capital Region Legislative Delegation, Louisiana Legislative Women's Caucus and Louisiana Republican Legislative Delegation. During the prior four-year term, Davis was a member of four legislative committees: Insurance, Joint Legislative Committee on Capital Outlay, Municipal, Parochial, and Cultural Affairs and Ways and Means.

In 2018, Davis was named 2018 LegisGator of the Year by the Southwest Louisiana Chamber of Commerce for her pro-business voting record.

Personal life

Davis is married and has one child. She resides in Baton Rouge. In addition to being a commercial real estate agent with Waters & Pettit, Davis has been an active member within the Baton Rouge non-profit community, serving as 2017 President of the Baton Rouge Symphony League, Co-Chair of the 2016 Baton Rouge Symphony League Madhatters fundraiser, and Co-Chair of the 2015 Manship Theatre's 10th Anniversary fundraiser. Davis currently serves on the Board of Directors for The ARC of Baton Rouge, the Louisiana Arts and Science Museum, and the LSU Ogden Honors College. She is a member of the Episcopal Church.

References

External links
 www.PaulaDavisforLA.com - official campaign website

 Representative Paula Davis – official legislative website

Living people
1973 births
Republican Party members of the Louisiana House of Representatives
People from Breaux Bridge, Louisiana
Women in Louisiana politics
People from East Baton Rouge Parish, Louisiana
21st-century American women politicians
21st-century American politicians
Louisiana State University alumni